Alekino is a rural locality (a village) in Biryakovskoye Rural Settlement, Sokolsky District, Vologda Oblast, Russia. The population was 3 as of 2002.

Geography 
Alekino is located 98 km northeast of Sokol (the district's administrative centre) by road. Semenovo is the nearest rural locality.

References 

Rural localities in Sokolsky District, Vologda Oblast